Bellreguard is a municipality in the comarca of Safor in the Valencian Community, Spain.

Bellreguard is a small village of just over 4,000 inhabitants located in the southeast of Valencia province, in the Mediterranean coast of Spain.

The local festivals are celebrated in September and the Moros i Cristians (Moors and Christians) parade is the most notable.

More information about this village can be found in Spanish and Valencian in the website of the Town Hall.

Notable people
 Salvador Canet García, cyclist
 Joan Pellicer i Bataller, ethnobotanist; "fill predilecte de Bellreguard"
 Vicent Savall Vidal, singer
 Joan Benlloch i Vivó, cardinal, Bishop of Urgell, Archbishop of Burgos; "fill adoptiu i predilecte de Bellreguard"
 Ferran Cremades, writer

References

Municipalities in the Province of Valencia
Safor